Talite Vaioleti (born 13 November 1980) is a Tongan rugby union player, born in Haveluloto, Tonga, who plays for National League 1 side, Darlington Mowden Park R.F.C. He is a utility player able to play as a Lock or in the Back Row.

Career 
Vaioleti started to play rugby for Club Levengamalie in 2003. After a club tour to New Zealand, he was persuaded to turn professional and in 2005, was selected to play for Tonga against France. While in France, he was approached to play club rugby in Europe. As a result of this,  Vaioleti played one season with Royan in France. From there along with some fellow Tongan players, he moved to England to play for Hertford in 2006. In 2007, Vaioleti joined Jersey where he became captain and led them to two promotions and a game at Twickenham Stadium in London. In 2010, Vaioleti left Jersey to move to Wharfedale after a recommendation from fellow Tongan, Latu Makaafi. After a season, in 2011 he moved to Rotherham Titans where despite making 8 appearances for them in the RFU Championship, due to a lack of starts he moved back to Jersey, who had just been promoted to the RFU Championship, in 2012.

International career 
Vaioleti has represented Tonga twice as well as appeared a number of times for Tonga A. In 2010 he received an invitation to represent The Barbarians under England national coach, Brian Ashton against a Forces XV where he scored two tries.

Personal life 
Vaioleti was married to a Jerseywoman named Catherine whom he met during his first stint at Jersey. Vaioleti is a member of the Church of Jesus Christ of Latter-day Saints. Between 2001 and 2003 he was a missionary in Australia. In 2011, he was interviewed by the BBC for a radio programme about the haka.

References 

1980 births
Living people
Rugby union locks
Tongan rugby union players
Barbarian F.C. players
Tonga international rugby union players
Tongan Mormon missionaries
21st-century Mormon missionaries
Mormon missionaries in Australia
Jersey Reds players
Wharfedale R.U.F.C. players
People from Tongatapu